Oaks  may refer to:

Plants

 Oak trees or shrubs in the genus Quercus in the plant family Fagaceae
 Other trees not in genus Quercus, see Oak (disambiguation)

People
Age Oks (known professionally as Agnes Oaks), Estonian ballerina
Dallin D. Oaks, American linguistics professor
Dallin H. Oaks (born 1932), American attorney, jurist, author, professor, public speaker, and religious leader
David Oaks, American executive director of MindFreedom International
Harold Anthony Oaks (1896-1968), Canadian World War I flying ace
Jeff Oaks, American poet
Louis D. Oaks, American Chief of Police for Los Angeles
Nathaniel T. Oaks (born 1946), American politician in Maryland
Robert Oaks (born 1952), American politician in New York
Robert C. Oaks (born 1936), American general and general authority of The Church of Jesus Christ of Latter-day Saints

Places
Oaks mountain, in Algeria
Oaks, Bell County, Kentucky
Oaks explosion at the Oaks Colliery, England.  Worst mine explosion in England.
Oaks, Missouri, US
Oaks, North Carolina, US
Oaks, Oklahoma, US
Oaks, Pennsylvania, US
Oaks, Shropshire, England
Oaks, Tasmania, Australia

Sport
Epsom Oaks, at Epsom Downs Racecourse, Surrey, England; the original Oaks race
Kennedy Oaks, at Flemington Racecourse, Melbourne, Australia
Oaks (greyhounds), English greyhound race
Oaks (Irish greyhounds), Irish greyhound race
The Oaks, nickname of the Romania national rugby union team
The Oaks, nickname of the sports teams at the former Dondero High School in Royal Oak, Michigan
Sports teams from Oakland, California:
Oakland Oaks (PCL) a defunct minor league baseball team in the Pacific Coast League
Oakland Oaks (ABL) a defunct basketball team that played in the American Basketball League
Oakland Oaks (ABA) a defunct basketball team that played in the American Basketball Association

Other uses
Oaks Christian High School in Westlake Village, California
Oaks Amusement Park, a historic amusement park in Portland, Oregon, US
The Oaks (TV series)
The Oaks (band), American rock band based out of Orlando, Florida

See also
Oaks Park (London), which lent its name to the Epsom Oaks horse race
Oaks Park (stadium)
Oak (disambiguation)
The Oaks (disambiguation)
Thousand Oaks (disambiguation)